Anak, Pagsubok Lamang (marketed as Anak, Pagsubok Lamang ng Diyos) is a 1996 Philippine action drama film directed by Deo J. Fajardo Jr. The film stars Robin Padilla, who wrote the story while serving a 17-year jail term for illegal possession of firearms. It also marks the film debut of Izza Ignacio and Mikey Arroyo.

Cast

Robin Padilla as Rico
Sharmaine Arnaiz as Kathryn
Jean Garcia as Kathryn's sister
Eva Cariño-Padilla as Aling Edna
Tirso Cruz III as Warden
Michael Rivero as Bingo
Ramon Christopher as Dennis
Jude Estrada as Joey
Ricky Davao as Escandor
Iza Ignacio as Vicky
Miguel Macapagal Arroyo as Mike
Jacku Flaminiano as Sonny Boy
Berting Labra as Teng Teng
Romeo Rivera as Kathryn's father
Kevin Delgado as abusive inmate
Ernie Zarate as prison director
Tony Carreon as politician
Alex Cunanan as Alex
Boy Gutierrez as Aling Edna's doctor
Nonong Talbo as Escandor's lawyer
Ric Sanchez as lawyer
Uldarico Jamora as judge
Luis Benedicto as Rico's doctor
Gio Santos as Gio
Ritchie Rivas as Ritchie
Dave Agbulos as Rico's Lawyer
Lyn Erastain as Sonny Boy's yaya

Production
The film was shot mostly inside the New Bilibid Prison, where Robin Padilla was serving a 17-year jail term for illegal possession of firearms. It caught the attention of Viva Films, which sued Padilla for breach of contract in which he is an exclusive artist. This prompted the film's release, originally in late 1995, to be delayed to January 1996.

Release
The film premiered at a theater in Greenhills, San Juan on January 9, 1996, with GMA Network's coverage of the event through the program Inside Showbiz being hosted by Aster Amoyo, Jackielou Blanco, Oskee Salazar, and Aga Muhlach. The film was released nationwide on January 11, 1996.

References

External links

1996 films
1996 action films
Filipino-language films
FLT Films films
Philippine action films